Richard Neville Dobson (born 23 August 1979) is a British singer, songwriter, sommelier and restaurateur from Solihull, England. He is most noted for being a member of the boy band Five.

Career

Music
The lure of the stage brought him to London where, in 1996 at the age of 17, he saw an advertisement in the national newspaper The Stage, asking for young male singers to audition for a new boy band with "attitude and edge". Neville, J Brown, Sean Conlon, Abs Breen and Scott Robinson, who had during the audition arranged themselves into a group, were subsequently picked and later became Five. Because there were two members named 'Richard' in the band (Abs was born Richard Abidin Breen), Breen used his nickname from his middle name whereas Neville kept his name but shortened to "Ritchie" instead.

In 2013 was revealed via Twitter that Five would be taking part in an ITV2 documentary series called The Big Reunion. In January, before the show began airing, it was reported that the group were looking to find a new member to replace Brown, and also having disagreement over the group's name. They then decided to continue as Five with just the four of them. On 14 January, it was announced that Ritchie would be taking part in the Channel 4 celebrity skiing competition The Jump finishing in 3rd place on the second of February. He acted as a replacement for actor Sam J. Jones, who had been forced to pull out after a shoulder injury. In August 2014, Abz Love announced that he had left the group via Twitter, without telling the other members beforehand.
The band has since continued as a three piece (Scott, Sean and Ritchie), then in February 2016, they released another album, entitled Keep On Movin' - The Best of Five.

Sommelier and restaurateur
In 2004, Neville moved to Australia and worked as a sommelier. In September 2006, four of the five original band members of Five announced they were reuniting – minus Conlon. The band began recording their first album since their breakup in 2001, but disbanded once again in 2007. In the autumn 2007 Neville was a participant in the second series of Cirque de Celebrité on Sky1. In 2012, he opened a restaurant in Sydney named Guerrilla Bar and Restaurant with critical acclaim in various media. The restaurant went into liquidation in March 2016.

Personal life
In 2008 Neville dated and eventually married Australian model and DJ Emily Scott. They wed in the town of Henley-on-Thames on 23 October 2008. They moved to Sydney, Australia following their wedding and split four months later. Their relationship only became public knowledge when Scott confirmed on 28 June 2009 that New South Wales police had taken out an interim Apprehended Violence Order (AVO) for the allegations on Neville until the matter was heard in a court. Scott alleged she has a scar above her left eye that was caused by a glass hitting her. However the case was dismissed in Manly Magistrates Court on 30 July 2009 and Neville was acquitted.

He started dating Atomic Kitten singer Natasha Hamilton in 2013 
On 23 April 2014, they announced they were expecting their first child together. Hamilton gave birth to a baby girl, Ella Rose, on 23 September 2014. Neville and Hamilton split in March 2016.

Filmography

References

External links
 World of Five – Official Five Site – currently down
 Five Fan Site
 Guerrilla in the Minst
 Guerrilla Bar and Restaurant
 Guerrilla Mist Glebe – Broadsheet Sydney

1979 births
Living people
British male singers
Five (band) members
People from Solihull
People educated at Solihull School
Musicians from the West Midlands (county)